The 1903 Manzikert earthquake struck Manzikert of nowadays Muş Province in eastern Turkey on 28 April. Registering a surface wave magnitude of 7.0, the earthquake originated from a highly active seismic zone. It killed 3,500 people and 20,000 animals, destroyed 12,000 homes, and is now listed among Turkey's deadliest earthquakes in recorded history. To this day, Turkey is threatened by major earthquakes – more than 100 earthquakes over 7.0 have taken place in the country's known history.

Geology 

The country of Turkey is situated on a highly active section of the Eurasian Plate boundary. The entire country lies within a zone of active deformation known as the Alpide belt. This zone of continental collision reaches from the Atlantic Ocean to the Himalaya Mountains and beyond; dating back to the Paleogene period. It has formed due to convergent movement between the Arabian, African, and Indian continental plates and the Eurasian plate. The Anatolian Plate is currently being squeezed out to the west by the ongoing collision between the Arabian plate and the Eurasian Plate, bounded to the southeast by the East Anatolian Fault and to the north by the North Anatolian Fault. To the east of the junction of these two faults, the Arabian Plate is in direct collision with the Eurasian Plate. This area is characterised by thrust faulting and was the area in which the 1903 event occurred.

Damage and casualties 
Among the world's deadliest earthquakes, the earthquake caused 3,500 direct fatalities. 12,000 homes were devastated. 20,000 animals (other than humans) were killed in the epicentral region of Manzikert-Patnos. Damage to a lesser extent reached Erzurum and Bitlis. On August 6, additional damage took place and people were injured when an aftershock rocked the same region.

Threat 
Major earthquakes have taken place in the region as early as 411 B.C. In the 20th century, 58 major destructive earthquakes took place – in total, they have killed more than 100,000 people, injured 150,000, and desolated approximately 420,000 homes and buildings. More than 100 earthquakes of magnitude 7 or greater have taken place in the country historically.

See also
 List of earthquakes in 1903
 List of earthquakes in Turkey

References 

1903 Manzikert
1903
1903 in the Ottoman Empire 
1903 disasters in the Ottoman Empire
1903 earthquakes
1903
April 1903 events